In mathematics, a metric outer measure is an outer measure μ defined on the subsets of a given metric space (X, d) such that

for every pair of positively separated subsets A and B of X.

Construction of metric outer measures

Let τ : Σ → [0, +∞] be a set function defined on a class Σ of subsets of X containing the empty set ∅, such that τ(∅) = 0. One can show that the set function μ defined by

where

is not only an outer measure, but in fact a metric outer measure as well. (Some authors prefer to take a supremum over δ > 0 rather than a limit as δ → 0; the two give the same result, since μδ(E) increases as δ decreases.)

For the function τ one can use

 

where s is a positive constant; this τ is defined on the power set of all subsets of X.  By Carathéodory's extension theorem, the outer measure can be promoted to a full measure; the associated measure μ is the s-dimensional Hausdorff measure.  More generally, one could use any so-called dimension function.

This construction is very important in fractal geometry, since this is how the Hausdorff measure is obtained. The packing measure is superficially similar, but is obtained in a different manner, by packing balls inside a set, rather than covering the set.

Properties of metric outer measures

Let μ be a metric outer measure on a metric space (X, d).

 For any sequence of subsets An, n ∈ N, of X with

and such that An and A \ An+1 are positively separated, it follows that

 All the d-closed subsets E of X are μ-measurable in the sense that they satisfy the following version of Carathéodory's criterion: for all sets A and B with A ⊆ E and B ⊆ X \ E,

 Consequently, all the Borel subsets of X — those obtainable as countable unions, intersections and set-theoretic differences of open/closed sets — are μ-measurable.

References

 

Measures (measure theory)
Metric geometry